Geidam is a Local Government Area in Yobe State, Nigeria. On 24 April 2021 terrorists from ISWAP seized Geidam killing 11 people, and over 6,000 residents were displaced. However, the Nigerian Armed Forces retook the town after an offensive against the terrorists.

It has an area of 4,357 km² and a population of 157,295 at the 2006 census.

The postal code of the area is 632.

Education
Mai-Idris Alooma Polytechnic, a state government higher education institution established in 1993.

See also 
 List of Local Government Areas in Yobe State

References

Habeeb elcready

Local Government Areas in Yobe State